Amanda Hickey, née Sanford (28 August 1838 – 17 October 1894), was an American surgeon.

Life
Amanda Hickey was born in New Bedford, Massachusetts on 28 August 1838. She attended the Friends' Academy in Union Springs, New York.  She enrolled in the Woman's Medical College of Pennsylvania where she received her M.D. degree in 1870. She interned at the New England Hospital for Women and Children before enrolling in the University of Michigan where she received another degree in 1871, the first woman to graduate from that institution. Hickey settled in Auburn, New York and started a private practice before she went to London, England, and Paris, France, for post-graduate work in 1879. Upon her return in 1880, Hickey became one of the founding members of the Auburn City Hospital staff. She married Patrick Hickey in 1884. She died of pneumonia on 17 October 1894. 

She had "a reputation as an outstanding surgeon, performing intra-abdominal surgery with above-average success."  A maternity hospital in Auburn was named in her honor.  Hickey was a member of the Medical Society of New York.  A supporter of women's rights, she helped to found the Cayuga County Political Equality Club.

References

1838 births
1894 deaths
University of Michigan alumni
American surgeons
Women surgeons
Woman's Medical College of Pennsylvania alumni
Physicians from Massachusetts
People from New Bedford, Massachusetts
Deaths from pneumonia in Massachusetts
19th-century American women physicians
19th-century American physicians
People from Auburn, New York